Scythris aerariella is a moth of the family Scythrididae. It was described by Gottlieb August Wilhelm Herrich-Schäffer in 1855. It is found in Bosnia-Herzegovina, Bulgaria, Croatia, the Republic of Macedonia, Greece, Hungary and Italy. It has also been recorded from Turkey.

References

aerariella
Moths described in 1855